Henry D. Swainston (1880–?) was an English professional association footballer who played as a centre forward. He played two matches in the Football League for Burnley.

References

1880 births
Year of death unknown
People from Skelmersdale
English footballers
Association football forwards
Burnley F.C. players
English Football League players